Not safe for work (NSFW) is Internet slang or shorthand used to mark links to content, videos, or website pages the viewer may not wish to be seen looking at in a public, formal or controlled environment. The marked content may contain graphic violence, pornography, profanity, nudity, slurs or other potentially disturbing subject matter. Environments that may be problematic include workplaces, schools, and family settings. NSFW has particular relevance for people trying to make personal use of the Internet at workplaces or schools which have policies prohibiting access to sexual and graphic subject matter. Conversely, safe for work (SFW) is used for links that do not contain such material, but where the title might otherwise lead people to think that content is NSFW.

The similar expression not safe for life (NSFL) is also used, referring to content which is so nauseating or disturbing that it might be emotionally scarring to view. Links marked NSFL may contain fetish pornography, gore or murder. Additionally, there is a distinction made to distinguish the content. Not safe for work violence (NSFWV) or Not safe for life violence (NSFLV) for violence to murder encompassing content, respectively Not safe for work eroticism (NSFWE) or Not safe for life eroticism (NSFLE), referring to fetishism and pornography; their usage is uncommon.

Some websites, such as Reddit and OnlyFans give users the option to designate their content as NSFW in order to warn others of its inappropriate nature.

See also

 Internet filter – software used to restrict access to unsuitable content.

References

External links

Internet censorship
Internet culture
Internet slang
Internet terminology
Internet trolling
Media content ratings systems
Pornography